The Reform Front Party (El Isla) is a Salafist political party in Tunisia. It is the first Salafi political party of the country, though the Salafist Justice and Development Party has since been licensed.
The party was established in 2012. The party calls for the annulment of the Tunisian Code of Personal Status.

References

2012 establishments in Tunisia
Islamic political parties in Tunisia
Political parties established in 2012
Political parties in Tunisia
Salafi Islamist groups
Sunni Islamic political parties